Condesuyos Province is one of eight provinces in the Arequipa Region of Peru. Its seat is Chuquibamba.

Geography 
The Andean Volcanic Belt and the Wansu mountain range traverse the province. Some of the highest peaks of the province are listed below:

Political division
The province is divided into eight districts which are:

 Andaray (Andaray)
 Cayarani (Cayarani)
 Chichas (Chichas)
 Chuquibamba (Chuquibamba)
 Iray (Iray)
 Río Grande (Iquipi)
 Salamanca (Salamanca)
 Yanaquihua (Yanaquihua)

Ethnic groups 
The province is inhabited by indigenous citizens of Quechua descent. Spanish, however, is the language which the majority of the population (73.02%) learnt to speak in childhood, 26.37% of the residents started speaking using the Quechua language (2007 Peru Census).

See also 
 Pallaqucha

Sources 

Provinces of the Arequipa Region